Watkins Mill in Lawson, Missouri, United States, is a preserved woolen mill dating to the mid-19th century. The mill is protected as Watkins Woolen Mill State Historic Site, which preserve its machinery and business records in addition to the building itself. It was designated a National Historic Landmark and added to the National Register of Historic Places in 1966 in recognition for its remarkable state of preservation. The historic site is the centerpiece of Watkins Mill State Park, which is managed by the Missouri Department of Natural Resources.

History
Waltus L. Watkins established the 80-acre livestock farm he called Bethany Plantation in 1839. Watkins Mill was built in 1859-1860. Watkins built housing for the mill workers nearby, creating one of the first planned communities in North America. The community was effectively self-sufficient, the mill producing yarn and wool cloth. The mill operated at capacity until 1886, two years after Watkins' death. From 1886 to the turn of the twentieth century production declined. Nearly all of the mill machinery has been preserved, including a 65-horsepower steam engine that powered the factory.

The site also includes the Watkins house, dating to 1850. The twelve-room, 2½-story house includes three staircases, the main stair detailed in carved walnut. It remained a Watkins family home until 1945.

The Franklin School, or Octagonal School, is an octagonal schoolhouse built in 1856 and  used by the Watkins family and their employees until the mid-1870s, when it became a residence for mill workers. The unusual octagonal building was built of locally manufactured brick on Watkins land.

The Watkins family also donated the land for Mt. Vernon Baptist Church, built in 1871 to replace a log church dating to the 1850s. Of the $5000 construction cost, more than half was donated by Watkins.

After going through several changes in ownership, the state of Missouri took possession of the property, creating a  state park in 1964.  It was named a National Mechanical Engineering Historic Landmark in 1980.

State park 
The recreation area of the state park has 96 campsites, most of which have electric hookups, and many of which are available year-round. A  lake supports fishing for bass, catfish, crappie and sunfish and has a large sand swimming beach.  A  asphalt bicycling and walking trail follows the shoreline of the lake, and there is a separate  equestrian trail.

See also
List of Missouri state parks
List of National Historic Landmarks in Missouri
National Register of Historic Places listings in Clay County, Missouri

References

External links

Watkins Mill State Park Missouri Department of Natural Resources 
Watkins Woolen Mill State Historic Site Missouri Department of Natural Resources 
Watkins Woolen Mill State Park and State Historic Site Map Missouri Department of Natural Resources 
Watkins Mill Association

Historic American Engineering Record in Missouri
Industrial buildings completed in 1860
Protected areas of Clay County, Missouri
Mill museums in Missouri
State parks of Missouri
Museums in Clay County, Missouri
National Historic Landmarks in Missouri
Protected areas established in 1964
Textile mills in the United States
Textile museums in the United States
Missouri State Historic Sites
Octagonal school buildings in the United States
Historic districts on the National Register of Historic Places in Missouri
National Register of Historic Places in Clay County, Missouri
Industrial buildings and structures on the National Register of Historic Places in Missouri
Grinding mills on the National Register of Historic Places
Historic Mechanical Engineering Landmarks
Woollen mills